"Let Me In" is a song performed by Belgian singer-songwriter Tom Dice, released as the fourth single from his second studio album Heart for Sale (2012). It was released on 15 April 2013 as a digital download in Belgium on iTunes. The song was written by Dion Howell, Tom Dice and produced by Jeroen Swinnen.

Track listing

Credits and personnel
 Lead vocals – Tom Dice
 Record producers – Jeroen Swinnen
 Lyrics – Dion Howell, Tom Dice
 Label: Universal Music Belgium

Chart performance

Weekly charts

Release history

References

2013 singles
Tom Dice songs
Songs written by Tom Dice